Second Tour is a 1939 Czech drama film directed by Martin Frič.

Cast
 Zdeněk Štěpánek as Engr. Jiri Gregor
 Vlasta Fabianová as Marie Gregorova
 Karel Benísko
 Vítezslav Bocek
 Ladislav Boháč as Engr. Petr Lukas
 Karel Cerný as Dr. Vaclavik
 Karel Dostal as Senate Chairman
 Alois Dvorský as Josef Skoula
 Eman Fiala as Obeslo
 Jarmila Holmová as Lawyer's Secretary
 František Kreuzmann as Judge
 Ladislav Kulhánek as Doctor

References

External links
 

1940 films
1940 drama films
1940s Czech-language films
Czechoslovak black-and-white films
Films directed by Martin Frič
1940s Czech films